Ochelle Anya De Courcy (born 5 August 1997), known as Anya De Courcy, is a Trinidadian footballer who plays as a forward for Norwegian First Division club Røa IL and the Trinidad and Tobago women's national team.

Early life
De Courcy was born in Trinidad to a Norwegian father and a Trinidadian mother. When she was around five years old, she and her family moved to Antigua, Antigua and Barbuda, remaining there until she was 15, when her family ultimately settled in Norway. She holds both Trinidad and Tobago and Norwegian citizenships. She does not have the Antigua and Barbuda one, despite calling herself as Antiguan.

Club career
In 2013, shortly after moving to Norway, De Courcy joined Sunndal Fotball, where she would spend two seasons. After that, she moved to SK Trondheims-Ørn, making her Toppserien debut in 2017. Next year, she was transferred to Byåsen Toppfotball, playing there until mid-2019 season, when she joined Røa.

International career
De Courcy played once for the Norway women's national under-17 football team in 2014. She made her senior debut for Trinidad and Tobago on 21 October 2021.

References

External links

1997 births
Living people
Trinidad and Tobago women's footballers
Women's association football forwards
Trinidad and Tobago women's international footballers
Trinidad and Tobago women's futsal players
Trinidad and Tobago people of Norwegian descent
Trinidad and Tobago emigrants to Antigua and Barbuda
Trinidad and Tobago emigrants to Norway
People with acquired Norwegian citizenship
Norwegian women's footballers
SK Trondheims-Ørn players
Røa IL players
Toppserien players
Norway women's youth international footballers
Norwegian women's futsal players
Norwegian people of Trinidad and Tobago descent
Sportspeople of Trinidad and Tobago descent